John Fiennes ( 1612–1708) was the third son of Puritan noble and politician William Fiennes, 1st Viscount Saye and Sele. He served in the Parliamentarian army during the First English Civil War, before resigning his commission when elected MP for Morpeth in 1645. Excluded from Parliament by Pride's Purge in December 1648, he largely avoided politics thereafter but was appointed to Cromwell's Upper House in 1658.

Personal details
John Fiennes was born  1612, probably at the family home of Broughton Castle in Oxfordshire, third son of the Puritan peer and politician William Fiennes, 1st Viscount Saye and Sele (1582–1662), and his wife Elizabeth Temple (died 1648). He had two elder brothers James (1602–1674) and Nathaniel ( 1608–1669), to whom he was especially close, and three sisters, Bridget, Constance and Elizabeth.

At some point after 1670, he married Susannah Hobbs (1657–1715); their fifth and only surviving son, Lawrence (1690–1742), succeeded his cousin as Fifth Viscount Saye and Sele in January 1710, by which date Fiennes had died.

Career

At the outbreak of the First English Civil War he joined the Parliamentarian side, and rose to the rank of the colonel of a regiment of horse by 1643, and served at the Battle of Naseby.

He was elected to the Long Parliament as member for Morpeth, probably in 1645, but was one of the MPs excluded in Pride's Purge in December 1648. In 1658, he was chosen a member of Cromwell's Upper House.

References

Sources
 
 Concise Dictionary of National Biography (1930)
D. Brunton & D. H. Pennington, Members of the Long Parliament (London: George Allen & Unwin, 1954)
Cobbett's Parliamentary history of England, from the Norman Conquest in 1066 to the year 1803 (London: Thomas Hansard, 1808) 
 Mark Noble, Memoirs of several persons and families... allied to or descended from... the Protectorate-House of Cromwell (Birmingham: Pearson & Rollason, 1784) 

English MPs 1640–1648
Roundheads
John
Younger sons of viscounts
Place of birth missing
Members of Parliament for Morpeth
Parliamentarian military personnel of the English Civil War
Members of Cromwell's Other House
1612 births
1708 deaths